Bijou Lilly Phillips Masterson (born April 1, 1980) is an American actress, model and singer. The daughter of musician John Phillips and Geneviève Waïte, she began her career as a model. Phillips made her singing debut with I'd Rather Eat Glass (1999), and since her first major film appearance in Black and White (1999), she has acted in Almost Famous (2000), Bully (2001), The Door in the Floor (2004), Hostel: Part II (2007), and Choke (2008). From 2010 to 2013, she played the recurring role of Lucy Carlyle on the television series Raising Hope.

Early life
Phillips was born on April 1, 1980, in Greenwich, Connecticut, and is the daughter of John Phillips of The Mamas and the Papas and his third wife, Geneviève Waïte, a South African model, artist, and actress. She was named for the song "My Petite Bijou" by Lambert, Hendricks & Ross (bijou means 'jewel' in French). She is the youngest of Phillips's children; she has one brother, Tamerlane, and three half-siblings (Mackenzie, Jeffrey, and Chynna). After her parents split up, both were found unfit to have custody of Bijou and she was placed in foster care with a family in Bolton Landing, New York. She lived there on and off, making extended visits with her parents, who had both acquired houses in the area. Her father won custody when she was in third grade, and she moved with him to Lloyd Harbor, a village of the Town of Huntington, Long Island.

According to Waïte, when Phillips was 13 years old, her half-sister Mackenzie informed Bijou of her (Mackenzie's) ten-year incestuous relationship with their father, and the information had a devastating effect on Bijou's teenage years, stripping her of her innocence and leaving her "wary of [her] father."

At 14, Phillips quit school and moved into her own apartment with a housekeeper, just off Fifth Avenue. Once described by The Observer as a "wild child", she experienced a rebellious childhood in New York City, where she used to party, drink and take drugs, such as cocaine, ecstasy, and heroin. On this period of her life, she remarked: "If you were 14 years old and able to live on your own in an apartment in New York City, and you got invited to all these clubs, and you got a bank account and you had a car service you could call so that you could go wherever you wanted ... What would happen?". At 15, she reportedly lost her virginity to singer Evan Dando. Growing up, she became somewhat of a local tabloids' fixture due to her late-night persona and association with other socialites like sisters Paris and Nicky Hilton. At 17, following the death of her friend, the 20-year-old Manhattan socialite Davide Sorrenti, due to a heroin overdose, her father sent her into rehab.

Career

Beginnings (1994–1999)
Phillips was on the cover of Interview magazine when she was 13. Shortly thereafter, she appeared on the cover of Vogue Italia. Phillips also became an image model for Calvin Klein and appeared in several advertising campaigns in which adolescents showed white underwear. The campaigns were widely condemned as eerily pedophilic. She has expressed her distaste for the modeling world, and once stated in an interview: "It was like, I wanted to go swimming in the ocean, but I was jumping up and down in a puddle."

After signing a record deal at age 17, Phillips began working on her debut album I'd Rather Eat Glass, produced by Jerry Harrison. It was released on May 11, 1999, by Almo Sounds, and remains her only full-length music release to date. The album's title refers to her past as a fashion model, saying she would "rather eat glass" than go back to modeling. Phillips collaborated with a number of artists when writing songs for the album, including Eric Bazilian, Greg Wells, Dave Bassett, Howard Jones and Jill Cunniff. Upon its release, I'd Rather Eat Glass received mixed reviews from music critics, mostly criticising the work for being immature, but her musical style has been positively compared to Natalie Imbruglia or Kay Hanley of Letters to Cleo.

Phillips made her film debut in a brief role of the independent drama Sugar Town (1999). Her first major film role came the same year, as an Upper East Side girl trying to fit in with the black hip-hop crowd, in James Toback's drama Black and White, opposite Robert Downey Jr., Jared Leto, Brooke Shields and Elijah Wood. The film received mixed reviews and found a limited audience in theaters, but AllMovie remarked: "[The film] starts off strong with a provocative performance by newcomer Bijou Phillips as the most unapologetic seeker of approval from her hip-hop-loving friends. Phillips eventually fades into the background, and the film becomes hampered by Toback's insistence upon grafting a standard crime-drama plot".

Acting breakthrough (2000–2005)
Phillips appeared with Kate Hudson in Cameron Crowe's semi-biographical musical drama Almost Famous (2000). The film was a success and received four Academy Awards nominations. 2001 saw Phillips star in two independent coming-of-age films. In Tart, opposite Dominique Swain and Melanie Griffith, she played the longtime friend of a young woman at a preparatory school in 1980s New York City. PopMatters found Phillips to be one of the only intriguing actors in the film, "thanks to yet another fearless performance". In Bully, based on the 1993 murder of Bobby Kent, she took on the role of one in a group of several young adults in South Florida who enact a murder plot against a mutual friend who has emotionally, physically and sexually abused them for years. The film had a mixed critical response, but famed critic Roger Ebert was one of its notable admirers and gave it four out of four stars. Her performance in the film led The Hollywood Reporter to name her one of 2002's "Shooting Stars of Tomorrow".

In 2003, Phillips starred as a member of a bizarre cult of young criminals, alongside Mischa Barton, in the thriller Octane, which premiered at the Cannes Film Festival. In 2004, she played the nanny of an author's young daughter, with Jeff Bridges and Kim Basinger, in The Door in the Floor (2004), a drama with heavy sexual themes adapted from the novel A Widow for One Year by John Irving. Phillips starred with Anne Hathaway in the drama Havoc (2005) as a spoiled socialite, appearing nude in some of its scenes. ViewLondon wrote that the "supporting cast are superb, particularly Bijou Phillips" as the "trashy best friend", while Variety asserted: "As played by Hathaway and Phillips, the friendship between [their characters] rings girlish and true, and comes complete with tantalizing, lesbian-flavored moments". Havoc was not released in theaters in the United States due to unfavorable critical reception. She appeared as an ill-fated high school senior in the slasher film Venom (also 2005), produced by Kevin Williamson.

Horror films (2006–2009)
In 2007, Phillips starred in the independent horror film The Wizard of Gore, as the girlfriend of a magic magazine's publisher, and collaborated with actress Lauren German in three films, the first being the comedy drama Spin, about seven people at a popular Los Angeles nightclub. In Hostel: Part II, which served as a sequel to Hostel (2005), Phillips starred as one of three American female art students in Rome who are directed to a Slovak village where they are kidnapped and taken to a facility in which rich clients pay to torture and kill people. She claimed that her torture sequence, which entails her being scalped by a power saw, required around forty-five setups. "I don't think I could do something like this again", she stated in a 2007 interview. "I'm glad that I had the experience, and I love my job, but we went into places that I didn't know existed, and I don't need to do that again." Banned from theatrical release in several countries, Hostel: Part II was released theatrically in the United States, to lackluster box office returns.

The biographical film What We Do Is Secret featured Phillips as Lorna Doom, the Germs' bassist and a close friend of singer Darby Crash. Director Rodger Grossman cast Phillips when she was 17 years old, and she stayed committed to the project for the entire time it took to bring the film into production, which was almost one decade. She received critical acclaim for her portrayal; Phil Gallo for Variety found her performance to be "striking" and stated that her character "lights up in a unique way whenever she's in Crash's company or simply talking about him." In 2008, Phillips appeared in the documentary Chelsea on the Rocks, about the Hotel Chelsea, directed by Abel Ferrara, and starred as a milkmaid, opposite Sam Rockwell and Anjelica Huston, in the well-received black comedy Choke, based on the Chuck Palahniuk's novel of the same name. In Dark Streets (her last 2008 film), Phillips played a love interest and the alluring star singer of a club in 1930s New York City.

In 2009, Phillips had starring roles in four independent feature films, three of which were opposite Danny Masterson. Her first release in the year was the romantic comedy Wake, in which she played an emotionally isolated, modern woman who meets a man mourning his fiancée at a funeral. The horror film It's Alive, a remake of the 1974 film of the same name written and directed by Larry Cohen, saw Phillips star as a mother who has a murderous baby. Dread Central, in its review for the film, noted: "Bijou Philips is undoubtedly the star here, jumping into her role in what is admittedly just a piece of schlock cinema with great aplomb". In the comedy Made for Each Other, Phillips would reunite with Lauren German and also play a woman whose husband decides the only way to morally rectify his cheating is to get his wife to cheat on him. Her last 2009 film was the crime drama The Bridge to Nowhere, portraying a sex worker.

Television and hiatus (2010–present)
In FOX's sitcom Raising Hope (2010–2014), Phillips played the title character's biological mother, and a serial killer sentenced to death. Until its finale, she appeared in a total of seven episodes of the series. In 2010 and 2012, she guest-starred in episodes of the police procedural television series Hawaii Five-0 and Law & Order: Special Victims Unit, and in 2011 she appeared in the video for Broken Social Scene's song "Sweetest Kill". Phillips has not acted since her last appearance in Raising Hope, opting to focus on her family and health.

Personal life
Phillips dated Sean Lennon at some point in the mid-2000s and she became the muse and subject matter of his 2006 album Friendly Fire.

In 2004, Phillips began dating Danny Masterson; the couple met at a poker tournament in Las Vegas. They are both Scientologists. The couple announced their engagement in March 2009. They were married on October 18, 2011, in a private castle in Ireland. On February 14, 2014, Phillips gave birth to their daughter.

Phillips has starred with Masterson in several films and in a 2011 episode of Fox's Raising Hope.

On February 17, 2017, Masterson revealed that Phillips had been suffering from kidney disease for five years. She was born with small kidneys and had been battling the disease by living a stress-free life, eating a vegan diet, and getting dialysis. She suffered from a blood infection and was in need of a transplant. On April 7, 2017, she received a kidney transplant.

Homophobic abuse allegations
In November 2017, actor Daniel Franzese alleged that Phillips had "ridiculed" him about his sexuality and weight and physically assaulted him on the set of Bully. Phillips subsequently apologized for her behavior. The same month, actress Heather Matarazzo claimed that Phillips had held her against a wall and choked her shortly before filming for Hostel: Part II began.

Controversy
Phillips has defended both her father and her husband (the former accused of rape and incest by Phillips's half-sister Mackenzie; the latter accused of rape and sexual assault by multiple women) in the face of allegations of sexual abuse.

Of Mackenzie's allegations against their father, Phillips said, "I'm 29 now, I've talked to everyone who was around during that time, I've asked the hard questions. I do not believe my sister. Our father [was] many things. This is not one of them." In contrast, Phillips also stated that Mackenzie told her about their incestuous relationship, and that the news was "confusing and scary" and that she was "heartbroken" to think that her family left her alone with her father. In a 2000 interview with Bruce LaBruce she discussed a song she had written about her father with the refrain, "He touched me wrong," but didn't go into detail about whether the lyrics referred to herself or someone else.

Between 2017 and 2020, Phillips's husband Danny Masterson was accused of rape, harassment and stalking of several women (including Chrissie Carnell-Bixler, the wife of musician Cedric Bixler-Zavala). Masterson has not responded directly to any of the allegations, but on Instagram, Phillips mocked Carnell-Bixler's police report detailing Masterson's alleged rape.

Filmography

Film

Television

Video games

Discography
Albums
I'd Rather Eat Glass (1999)

Singles

Promotional singles
"Hawaii" (1999)

References

External links

1980 births
American female models
American women singer-songwriters
American women rock singers
American film actresses
American rock songwriters
American people of South African descent
American people of British descent
American voice actresses
American video game actresses
Living people
Actresses from Greenwich, Connecticut
American Scientologists
20th-century American actresses
21st-century American actresses
Musicians from Greenwich, Connecticut
Singer-songwriters from New York (state)
Kidney transplant recipients
21st-century American singers
21st-century American women singers
Masterson family
American socialites
Phillips family
Singer-songwriters from Connecticut